Maria Walsh may refer to:

 Maiara Walsh (born 1988), Brazilian American actress and singer 
 María Elena Walsh (1930–2011), Argentine known for her songs and books for children
 Maria Walsh (politician) (born 1987), Irish Member of the European Parliament, and winner of the 2014 Rose of Tralee